The economy of Slovakia is based upon Slovakia becoming an EU member state in 2004, and adopting the euro at the beginning of 2009. Its capital, Bratislava, is the largest financial centre in Slovakia. As of Q1 2018, the unemployment rate was 5.72%.

Whereas between 1970 and 1985 real incomes increased by about 50%, they fell in the 1990s. The gross domestic product only returned to its 1989 level in 2007.

Due to the Slovak GDP growing very strongly from 2000 until 2008 – e.g. 10.4% GDP growth in 2007 – the Slovak economy was referred to as the Tatra Tiger.

History
Since the establishment of the Slovak Republic in January 1993, Slovakia has undergone a transition from a centrally planned economy to a free market economy, a process which some observers were to believe was slowed in the 1994–98 period due to the crony capitalism and other fiscal policies of Prime Minister Vladimír Mečiar's government. While economic growth and other fundamentals improved steadily during Mečiar's term, public and private debt and trade deficits also rose, and privatization was uneven. Real annual GDP growth peaked at 6.5% in 1995 but declined to 1.3% in 1999.

Two governments of the "liberal-conservative" Prime Minister Mikuláš Dzurinda (1998–2006) pursued policies of macroeconomic stabilization and market-oriented structural reforms. Nearly the entire economy has now been privatized, and foreign investment has picked up. Economic growth exceeded expectations in the early 2000s, despite recession in key export markets. In 2001 policies of macroeconomic stabilization and structural reform led to spiraling unemployment. Unemployment peaked at 19.2% (Eurostat regional indicators) in 2001, and though it has fallen to (depending on the methodology) 9.8%( or 13.5% as of September 2006, it remains a problem. Solid domestic demand boosted economic growth to 4.1% in 2002. Strong export growth, in turn, pushed economic growth to a still-strong 4.2% in 2003 and 5.4% in 2004, despite a downturn in household consumption. Multiple reasons entailed a GDP growth of 6% in 2005. Headline consumer price inflation dropped from 26% in 1993 to an average rate of 7.5% in 2004, though this was boosted by hikes in subsidized utilities prices ahead of Slovakia's accession to the European Union. In July 2005, the inflation rate dropped to 2.0% and is projected at less than 3% in 2005 and 2.5% in 2006. In 2006, Slovakia reached the highest economic growth (8.9%) among the members of OECD and the third highest in the EU (just behind Estonia and Latvia). The country has had difficulties addressing regional imbalances in wealth and employment. GDP per capita ranges from 188% of EU average in Bratislava to only 54% in Eastern Slovakia.

About 10% of the Slovak labour force is expatriate in 2014. The country has one of the highest levels of long-term unemployment in Europe, with 7.1% of the labour force unemployed for more than a year in 2017.

GDP growth
The development of Slovakia's GDP according to the World Bank:

In 2007, Slovakia obtained the highest GDP growth among the members of OECD and the EU, with the record level of 14.3% in the fourth quarter. In 2014, GDP growth was 2.4% and in 2015 and 2016 Slovakia's economy grew 3.6% and 3.3% respectively. For year 2018, National Bank of Slovakia predicts raise of GDP by 4%.

Foreign investments

Foreign direct investment (FDI) in Slovakia has increased dramatically. Cheap and skilled labor, a 19% flat tax rate for both businesses and individuals, no dividend taxes, a weak labor code, and a favorable geographical location are Slovakia's main advantages for foreign investors. FDI inflow grew more than 600% from 2000 and cumulatively reached an all-time high of, US$17.3 billion in 2006, or around $18,000 per capita by the end of 2006. The total inflow of FDI in 2006 was $2.54 billion. In October 2005 new investment stimuli introduced – more favorable conditions to IT and research centers, especially to be located in the east part of the country (where there is more unemployment), to bring more added value and not to be logistically demanding.
 
Origin of foreign investment 1996–2005 – the Netherlands 24.3%; Germany 19.4%, Austria 14.1%; Italy 7.5%, United States (8th largest investor) 4.0%. Top investors by companies: Deutsche Telekom (Germany), Neusiedler (Austria), Gaz de France (France), Gazprom (Russia), U.S.Steel (U.S.), MOL (Hungary), ENEL (Italy), E.ON (Germany)...

Foreign investment sectors – industry 38.4%; banking and insurance 22.2%; wholesale and retail trade 13.1%; production of electricity, gas and water 10.5%; transport and telecommunications 9.2%.

Foreign direct investment " on green field"
inflows -2003: US$756 million,2004: US$1261 million,2005: US$1908 million
outflows-2003:  US$22 million,2004: -144 million USD,2005: US$146 million
Former minister (1998-2002) Brigita Schmögnerová explains that: "There is still a consensus among leaders on social dumping. Since the enlargement of the European Union, foreign companies have been looking for the cheapest labour, but instead of joining forces, governments in the region compete to offer the lowest possible level of taxes. When Slovakia joined the European Union in 2004, it became the first OECD country to introduce a full flat tax rate of 19% on both corporate profits and income or consumer goods. The lack of tax progressivity leads to a sharp increase in inequality. Spending on health, education or housing is below the EU average.

Services
Slovak service sector grew rapidly during the last 10 years and now employs about 69% of the population and contributes with over 61% to GDP. Slovakia's tourism has been rising in recent years, income has doubled from US$640 million in 2001 to US$1.2 billion in 2005.

Industry
Slovakia became industrialized mostly in the second half of the 20th century. Heavy industry (including coal mining and the production of machinery and steel) was built for strategic reasons because Slovakia was less exposed to the military threat than the western parts of Czechoslovakia. After the end of the Cold War, the importance of industry, and especially of heavy industry, declined. In 2010, industry (including construction) accounted for 35.6% of GDP, compared with 49% in 1990. Nowadays, building on a long-standing tradition and a highly skilled labor force, main industries with potential of growth are following sectors: Automotive, Electronics, Mechanical engineering, Chemical engineering, Information technology.

The automotive sector is among the fastest growing sectors in Slovakia due to the recent large investments of Volkswagen (Bratislava), Peugeot (Trnava), Kia Motors (Žilina) and since 2018 also Jaguar Land Rover in Nitra. Passenger car production was 1,040,000 units in 2016, what makes Slovakia the largest automobile producer in produced cars per capita. Other big industrial companies include U.S. Steel (metallurgy), Slovnaft (oil industry), Samsung Electronics (electronics), Foxconn (electronics), Mondi SCP (paper), Slovalco (aluminum production), Hyundai Mobis (automotive), Continental Matador (automotive) and Whirlpool Corporation. In 2006, machinery accounted for more than a half of Slovakia's export.

Largest companies by revenue

Largest companies by profit

Agriculture
In 2016, agriculture accounted for 3.6% of GDP (compared to 6.9% in 1993) and occupied about 3.9% of the labor force (down from 10.2% in 1994). Over 40% of the land in Slovakia is cultivated. The southern part of Slovakia (bordering with Hungary) is known for its rich farmland. Growing wheat, rye, corn, potatoes, sugar beets, grains, fruits and sunflowers. Vineyards are concentrated in Little Carpathians, Tokaj, and other southern regions. The breeding of livestock, including pigs, cattle, sheep, and poultry is also important.

Slovakia produced in 2018:

 1.9 million tons of wheat;
 1.5 million tons of maize;
 1.3 million tons of sugar beet (the beet is used to manufacture sugar and ethanol);
 486 thousand tons of barley;
 480 thousand tons of rapeseed;
 201 thousand tons of sunflower seed;
 169 thousand tons of potato;
 104 thousand tons of soybean;

In addition to smaller productions of other agricultural products, like grape (52 thousand tons).

Information technology
In recent years, service and high-tech-oriented businesses have prospered in Slovakia. Many global companies, including IBM, Dell, Lenovo, AT&T, SAP, Amazon, Johnson Controls, Swiss Re and Accenture, have built outsourcing and service centres in Bratislava and Košice (T-Systems, Cisco Systems, Ness, Deloitte). Slovak IT companies, including ESET, Sygic and Pixel Federation have headquarters in Bratislava.

Innovation
According to a recent report by the European Commission, Slovakia (along with some other Central and Eastern European economies) is low on the list of EU states in terms of innovation (Slovakia ranks 22nd). Within the EU, it ranks next to last on knowledge creation and last for innovation and entrepreneurship. In the process of transition to a knowledge economy, it particularly lacks investment into education and a broader application of IT. The World Bank urges Slovakia to upgrade information infrastructure and reform the education system. The OECD states that a stronger product market competition would help.

In March 2006, the Slovak government introduced new measures to implement the Action Plan for R&D and Innovation. The program covers the period from 2006 to 2010. The RDA is expected to launch at least one call for the expression of interests related to this program each year. The annual budget for the program will be set by the RDA. The overall amount available for the program depends on annual national budget resources and is likely to vary from year to year. Following an increase of around 50% in budget resources, the RDA disposes of a total budget of €19.31 million in 2006.

Labour
As of November 2022 the unemployment rate stood at 5.83%.

Statistics
Currency switch to the euro

Slovakia switched its currency from the Slovak crown (SK-slovenská koruna) to the Euro on 1 January 2009, at a rate of 30.1260 korunas to the euro.

Foreign trade

See also
Tatra Tiger
List of Slovak regions by GDP
List of Slovak companies
Economy of Europe

References

External links
 OECD's Slovakia country Web site and OECD Economic Survey of Slovakia
 Economy of Slovakia from The World Factbook
 Slovakia report (monitor 2005)
 Slovakia report (Index of Economic Freedom)
 Slovakia in selected macro-economic numbers
 Background note Slovakia (incl. economy)

 
Slovakia
Slovakia
Slovakia